The Fantasia 27 is a French sailboat, that was designed by Philippe H. Harlé and first built in 1981.

In 1987 the design was developed into the cruising-optimized Sun Way 27.

Production
The boat was built by Jeanneau in France between 1981 and 1996, with 1800 examples completed, but it is now out of production.

Design

The Fantasia 27 is a small recreational keelboat, built predominantly of fiberglass. It has a masthead sloop rig, a transom-hung rudder and a fixed fin keel or optionally twin keels or a centreboard. The full keel version displaces  and carries  of ballast. The centerboard version displaces  and carries  of ballast. The twin keel version carries  of ballast.

The twin-keels version has a  draft of 

The design has a PHRF handicap of 195-222 for the fin keel model, 116-225 for the centerboard model and 204-222 for the twin keel model.

See also
List of sailing boat types

Similar sailboats
Aloha 27
C&C 27
Cal 27
Cal 2-27
Cal 3-27
Catalina 27
Catalina 270
Catalina 275 Sport
Crown 28
CS 27
Edel 820
Express 27
Halman Horizon
Hotfoot 27
Hullmaster 27
Hunter 27
Hunter 27-2
Hunter 27-3
Irwin 27 
Island Packet 27
Mirage 27 (Perry)
Mirage 27 (Schmidt)
O'Day 272
Orion 27-2
Tanzer 27
Watkins 27
Watkins 27P

References

External links

 

Keelboats
1980s sailboat type designs
Sailing yachts
Sailboat type designs by Philippe Harlé
Sailboat types built by Jeanneau